Pare (or Mojokuto) is a town and district in the Kediri regency (kabupaten) within the province of East Java, Indonesia. The district covers an area of 49.69 km2 and had a population of 98,594 at the 2010 Census and 106,007 at the 2020 Census. Pare is well known as the English Village (Indonesian: Kampung Inggris) which is located at Tulungrejo, West Pare while in 1960's, Clifford Geertz had been conduct a research of Religion in Java and its relation to politics especially in context of Indonesian Politics in 1950's and 1960's (after 1955 Indonesian Legislative Election and 1955 Indonesian Constitutional Assembly Election)

References 

 Geertz, Clifford. The Religion of Java. Free Press, 1960. University of Chicago, 1976. [Originally a PhD thesis, Harvard University, 1956.]
 English Village Information Website info kampung inggris. The website provides information about English village which located at Pare, Kediri, Indonesia.

Districts of East Java
Kediri Regency